Ranganathan Francis, also known as Aranganathan (15 March 1920 – 1 December 1975), was an Indian field hockey player who played as a  goalkeeper. He was member of the Indian team that won gold medals at three consecutive Olympic games: 1948, 1952, and 1956.

Biography 
Francis was born on 15 March 1920 into a Hindu family as Manickam in Rangoon, Myanmar. He moved to Tamil Nadu, India, just before the India's independence, and converted to Christianity, changing his name as Ranganathan Francis. Francis died on 1 December 1975 at the age of 55.

Career 
Francis pursued his career as a hockey player with Madras Police and made it to the Indian national team. He represented India at the Olympics in 1948, 1952 and 1956.

Francis first came to prominence after his tour of Africa in 1947 with the Indian team led by Dhyan Chand. Francis served as a substitute goalkeeper for Leo Pinto in his maiden Olympic appearance, in 1948, when India beat Great Britain 4–0 in the final to clinch gold. He was also part of the Indian team which secured gold medal in the final against the Netherlands where India registered a comfortable 6–1 win during the 1952 Summer Olympics. Francis served as a second goalkeeper besides Shankar Laxman at the 1956 Summer Olympics where India claimed gold defeating neighbours arch-rivals Pakistan 1–0 in the final. Francis was part of the Indian squad that toured Malaya and Singapore in 1954.

Francis also went on to equal the record of Richard Allen for being the only Indian goalkeepers among the seven players to have won three Olympic gold medals. He also became only the second Indian hockey goalkeeper after Allen to feature in three Olympic Games. Francis also served as a policeman in Madras Police division and retired from the police service in 1968.

Legacy 
He was referred to as Singam by many on the play field during his peak career. He was also nicknamed as 'Titan between the Posts' as he was regarded as a very good technician during his playing days who came way out of his gate when the Indian team attacked and acted as a defender.

Tamil Nadu also started conducting Inspector Francis Memorial Hockey Tournament among schools, a tournament named after the veteran Ranganathan Francis.

In April 2019, musical sports drama film Natpe Thunai was released which was partially based on the true life story of Ranganathan Francis. However, he was referred to as Aranganathan in the film.

In October 2020, it was revealed that Chennai Hockey Association passed a resolution to rename the Mayor Radhakrishnan Stadium which is situated in Egmore as Olympiam Francis Hockey Stadium in honour of late Ranganathan Francis.

References

External links
 

1920 births
1975 deaths
Olympic field hockey players of India
Field hockey players at the 1948 Summer Olympics
Field hockey players at the 1952 Summer Olympics
Field hockey players at the 1956 Summer Olympics
Indian male field hockey players
Olympic gold medalists for India
Olympic medalists in field hockey
Medalists at the 1956 Summer Olympics
Medalists at the 1952 Summer Olympics
Medalists at the 1948 Summer Olympics
Sportspeople from Yangon
Field hockey players from Chennai
Indian Christians
Indian expatriates in British Burma